Amanda Lee Koe (born ) is a Singapore-born, New York-based novelist and short story writer. She is best known for her debut novel Delayed Rays of A Star, published by Doubleday in July 2019, and for being the youngest winner of the Singapore Literature Prize. Delayed Rays was named one of NPR's Best Books of 2019, and was a Straits Times #1 bestseller.

Early life

Childhood 
Koe was born in Singapore, the oldest of three children to Chinese parents who both worked for Singapore Airlines, her father as a pilot and her mother as a flight stewardess. Her father took her traveling solo with him as a child, and her mother read her fairytales. Her paternal grandfather was an opium-smoking Teochew laborer from Guangdong who emigrated to Singapore.

Growing up on Tsui Hark wuxia films and Disney movies in the 1990s in Singapore, Koe describes her cultural experience as "omnivorous". She said: "I was always most drawn to the villainess. Brigitte Lin as the Bride with White Hair, that was my favorite movie. I loved Cruella de Vil to bits."

Koe used to dress her younger siblings up as wuxia characters like Monkey God and the Eight Immortals, where she led them on adventures with "contiguous plots from day to day".

Teenage years 
As a teenager in an all-girls school in Singapore, Koe said she hated the rote education she received and rebelled against it.

Koe fell in love with a female Uyghur soccer player when her softball team went on a training trip to Shanghai, and was sent to corrective counseling when teachers found out she had a girlfriend. Koe said she had "zero visible queer role models", was labeled "wrong", "abnormal", and pressurized to change.

When she was 15, Koe watched The Hours in a mall. The Media Development Authority of Singapore had censored three lesbian kisses between Nicole Kidman, who played Virginia Woolf, and Miranda Richardson; Julianne Moore and Toni Colette; Meryl Streep and Allison Janey. This act of censorship led Koe to search for the deleted scenes on YouTube, which led to her discovering a fan video of Greta Garbo kissing a woman in Queen Christina, and Marlene Dietrich kissing a woman in Morocco.

The publicly bisexual Dietrich became Koe's idol. As a teenager, Koe had a poster of Dietrich on her bedroom wall. As a result, she became interested in Weimar culture, describing "a great affinity for Dada, Surrealism". She went on to major in cinema studies as an undergraduate in Singapore, where she recalled crying while watching Wim Wenders's Wings of Desire. She studied German, but after completing three modules, there were no further course offerings within her school, so she dropped the language.

Young adulthood 
Upon graduation, Koe wrote to Cahiers du cinéma for a job, but received no response. She next applied to work as a dancer with burlesque clubs in Germany and Australia, also receiving no response. She sold vintage and handmade clothes on Etsy for a time. Koe then marketed herself as an au pair who could coach children in Mandarin on a European forum. There was interest, but her work visa application ran into issues.

While working as a waitress in a Japanese restaurant and freelancing for a creative agency, Koe had a manic episode. She quit everything and started writing.

Career

Singapore 
In her early career in Singapore, Koe wrote short stories and supported herself with editorial work on the side. She was the fiction editor of Esquire Singapore, and the editor of the National Museum of Singapore’s film criticism magazine, Cinémathèque Quarterly.

The stories, written in bursts in her early 20s, became the collection Ministry of Moral Panic. Koe considers the collection to be "an early work (...) raw (...) but necessary for me at that time". The collection, Koe's first, unanimously won the Singapore Literature Prize in 2014, making her the youngest winner of Singapore's highest accolade for literature.

The same year, Koe was selected for the University of Iowa's International Writing Program. Soon after, she received a scholarship to attend Columbia University’s Writing Program.

New York 
Koe moved to New York in 2014. She used her $10,000 prize money from the Singapore Literature Prize to pay the rent of her Brooklyn apartment.

While browsing for a Nan Goldin photobook at The Strand in Manhattan, Koe encountered an Alfred Eisenstaedt monograph with Marlene Dietrich on its cover. Inside the book was a photograph of Marlene Dietrich, Anna May Wong, and Leni Riefenstahl together. The photograph had been taken when they had met at a ball in Berlin in 1928, before all three women had achieved fame.

Koe said she knew from the moment she saw this photograph that it was what she wanted to work on for her debut novel, because it was "the intimate gap in history, the lateral wormhole in time", that would allow her to "transcend (my) own limited time and space in a way that could be aesthetic and rigorous".

The working manuscript for Delayed Rays of a Star won the Henfield Prize in 2017, awarded to the best work of fiction in Columbia University’s Writing Program. Koe was signed to the Wylie Agency, and the manuscript sold to Doubleday before she graduated.

Work

Fiction

Ministry of Moral Panic 
Ministry of Moral Panic was published by Singaporean independent press Epigram Books in 2013. The collection caused a sensation in Singapore's literary landscape when it was published, for its uncommon and unflinching depiction of idiosyncratic characters from social peripheries told via inventive narratives that questioned the conservative Singaporean state's ideological imperatives. It was seen as "a subversive, artistic interpretation of how to challenge the homogenising power of a dominant discourse". Hannah Ming-yit Ho writes in Humanities (journal):Koe's stories about idiosyncratic Singaporeans illustrate the way personal experiences—of memory loss, homosexual tendencies, and emotional self-expressions—are informed by, and in turn inform, the biopolitical regulation of Singaporean citizens rendered objects of biopower. In this way, her stories invite a meditation on the state, people and power. In addition to the Singapore Literature Prize, Ministry of Moral Panic was also shortlisted for the Haus der Kulturen der Welt’s Internationaler Literaturpreis, the Frankfurt Book Fair’s LiBeraturpreis, and longlisted for the Frank O’Connor International Short Stories Award.

Delayed Rays of a Star 
Delayed Rays of a Star, Koe's first novel and her international debut, was published by Doubleday's Nan A. Talese imprint in July 2019.

Publishers Weekly called it "ambitious and well-researched ... successfully melds historical fact with expansive and generous storytelling".

Kirkus Reviews said:For a novel so dense with historical fact and larger-than-life celebrity cameos (everyone from John F. Kennedy to Walter Benjamin to David Bowie), its portrayals are nuanced enough that each character comes off as deeply human regardless of their fame or importance to the novel's plot ... It's the steady accumulation of intimate details like these that creates a sweeping sense of history that feels truly alive ... Expansive, complex, and utterly engrossing.NPR said:It is the moral tightropes each woman walks, and the razor thin edge between fulfilling one's ambition and selling one's soul, that is at the core of the novel (...) It is hard to summarize a sprawling and ambitious novel like this, so I won't — but it is expertly woven, its characters alive and full-bodied. Blending questions about pop culture, war, and art, Delayed Rays of a Star is that rare book that is neither high- nor low-brow, refusing such facile dichotomies and playing, instead, in the messiness of the grey areas.

Non-fiction 
Koe has advocated for the preservation of endangered modernist architecture in Singapore. She has also commented on the Singapore state's "value-free pragmatism", a ruling style put in place by the late founding father of Singapore, Lee Kuan Yew.

Translation 
Koe is a fluent Mandarin speaker and translator. She is working on a translation of Su Qing's Ten Years of Marriage, for which she was awarded a PEN/Heim Translation Grant.

Personal life 
Koe has named Søren Kierkegaard, Yasunari Kawabata, and early Vladimir Nabokov among her literary influences.

She has stated the importance of cinema in her life, citing Alain Resnais and Marguerite Duras's Hiroshima mon amour, Chantal Akerman's Jeanne Dielman, Wong Kar-wai's Fallen Angels, Rainer Werner Fassbinder's The Bitter Tears of Petra von Kant, and Ingmar Bergman's Cries and Whispers as films that have had a significant influence on her.

Koe identifies as queer. She lives in Brooklyn with her partner, Kirsten Tan, a Singapore-born filmmaker.

References

External links 

 AmandaLeeKoe.com

1980s births
Living people
Singaporean people of Chinese descent
Singaporean emigrants to the United States
American women novelists
21st-century American novelists
21st-century American short story writers
American women short story writers
21st-century American women writers
Singaporean LGBT writers
American LGBT writers
Singapore Literature Prize winners
Iowa Writers' Workshop alumni
Columbia University School of the Arts alumni
American LGBT people of Asian descent
21st-century LGBT people